Franco Purini, born as Francesco Purini (Isola del Liri, 9 November 1941), is an Italian architect, essayist, and university professor. He has designed many buildings, including the Torre Eurosky in Rome.

From 2003, he has taught at the La Sapienza University in Rome.

For his accomplishments in his field, as an architect and theoretician, he was elected Accademico Corrispondente in the Academy of Arts and Drawings of Florence.

Starting in 1966 he established a long life collaboration in Rome with his wife , with whom he participated to the Biennale of Venice and the Triennale of Milan.

In 1980 he was one of the architects called by Paolo Portoghesi to the Biennale of Venice to participate in the installation "Venezia Novissima" that became a manifesto of post modern architecture.

His projects consist of dense patterns of lines and cross references. His structures echoe rationalism and classical tradition, with clear citations of Maurizio Sacripanti and Giovan Battista Piranesi, which refer to the splendour of a metaphysic character.

References

Living people
1941 births
Architects from Lazio
20th-century Italian architects